Cincotta may refer to:

 Cincotta, an Italian surname
 Cincotta, California, a community in Fresno County
 Crystallaria cincotta, a fish better known as the diamond darter